Valmai Gee (born 8 April 1971) is an Irish former cricketer who played as a wicket-keeper. She appeared in one One Day International and one Twenty20 International for Ireland in 2009. She played in the 2015 Women's Super 3s for Dragons.

Career
Gee played for Ireland in the 2009 Women's European Cricket Championship. She made her only Women's ODI appearance against The Netherlands, and did not bat in the match. In the same tournament, she made her only Women's Twenty20 International appearance, again not batting in the match, and played in two other matches in the tournament, both against Scotland. Gee had previously played a Twenty20 match for Ireland against Nottinghamshire in the 2009 RSA T20 Cup. She was selected to play for Ireland in the 2009 Women's County Championship. She played in a match against Northumberland. In 2011, she also played in a Championship game against Cumbria. In 2015, she represented the Dragons team in the Women's Super 3s.

Aside from her playing career, Gee is a Level I coach. She has coached at a Washington Cricket League youth camp and for the United States Youth Cricket Association.

Awards
Playing for Leinster, she has won the Sandra Dawson award for Irish Division 1 wicket-keeper of the season multiple times.

References

External links

1971 births
Living people
Irish women cricketers
Ireland women One Day International cricketers
Ireland women Twenty20 International cricketers
Dragons (women's cricket) cricketers
Sportspeople from Cochabamba